William Paterson,  (September 19, 1839 – March 18, 1914) was a Canadian politician.

Paterson was born in Hamilton, Upper Canada, the son of James and Martha Paterson. His parents died from cholera in 1849 and he was adopted by Reverend Dr. Ferrier, a Presbyterian minister. He was educated in Hamilton and Caledonia. He moved to Brantford and became a manufacturer of biscuits and confectionery (William Paterson Limited was sold to George Weston in 1928
). He married Lucy Clive Davies in 1863.

He was first elected to the House of Commons of Canada in the Brant South riding in the 1872 election. The Liberal politician was re-elected in 1874, 1878, 1882, 1887, and 1891. He was defeated in the 1896 election but was elected in an 1896 by-election in Grey North, when the candidate elected for this riding died before the opening of the 9th Parliament.  In 1900, he was elected in the riding of Wentworth North and Brant. He was elected in 1904 and 1908 in the riding of Brant but was defeated in 1911. From 1896 to 1897, he was Controller of Customs and from 1897 to 1911 was Minister of Customs.

While Minister of Customs, he and W.A. Fielding, Minister Finance,  negotiated the Reciprocity Agreement of 1911.  Paterson, along with the Government, was defeated on September 21, 1911 on the reciprocity issue.  He then retired from active business and public life.

Paterson was deputy reeve of Brantford from 1869 to 1871 and mayor from 1872 to 1873.

On the occasion of his first election to Parliament Paterson's wife recorded on August 30, 1872:
'Grand Reform picnic in Burford where His Worship was presented with a token of regard in the shape of a walking stick of curious workmanship and silver band with inscription: "Presented to William Paterson, Esq. Mayor of Brantford, on his Election as member of the House of Commons for South Riding of the County of Brant Ontario, on the 19th August 1872, by many friends."'

Family legend has it that the cane was carved by Smoke Johnson, elder of the Six Nations community south of Brantford. The election was only two weeks before the presentation so the cane was in existence before the election and had the silver band applied just prior to the Grand Reform picnic where the cane was presented.

Archives 
There are William Paterson fonds at Trent University and Library and Archives Canada.

Electoral record

References

1839 births
1914 deaths
Liberal Party of Canada MPs
Mayors of Brantford
Members of the House of Commons of Canada from Ontario
Members of the King's Privy Council for Canada
Politicians from Hamilton, Ontario